Hithuge Edhun is a 2006 Maldivian romantic drama film directed by Amjad Ibrahim. Produced by Mohamed Abdulla under Dhekedheke Ves Productions, the film stars Niuma Mohamed, Mohamed Manik, Sheela Najeeb and Mohamed Shavin in pivotal roles.

Cast 
 Niuma Mohamed as Shaniya
 Mohamed Manik as Shahil
 Sheela Najeeb as Nisha
 Mohamed Shavin as Nahid
 Mohamed Vishan Aboobakuru as Idan
 Ahmed Aiham Ali 
 Mariyam Siyadha as Jeeza
 Nadhiya Hassan as Sofi
 Mariyam Haleem as Wakleedha; Shaniya's mother
 Ali Farooq as Mohamed; Shaniya's father
 Hussain Nooradeen as Shahil's friend
 Mariyam Shahuza as Idan's teacher
 Zeenath Abbas (Special appearance)

Soundtrack

Accolades

References

Maldivian romantic drama films
2006 films
Films directed by Amjad Ibrahim
2006 romantic drama films
Dhivehi-language films